José Saraiva Martins, C.M.F. GCC (born 6 January 1932) is a Portuguese Cardinal of the Roman Catholic Church. He was prefect of the Congregation for the Causes of Saints from 1998 to 2008.

Born in Gagos de Jarmelo in Guarda, Portugal, to Antonio and Maria (née da Natividade Martins) Saraiva, he joined the Congregation of the Missionary Sons of the Immaculate Heart of Mary, commonly known as the Claretians, and professed his vows on 22 August 1950. Saraiva Martins was ordained as a priest by Archbishop Ettore Cunial on 16 March 1957. He studied at the Pontifical Gregorian University and the Pontifical University of St. Thomas Aquinas (Angelicum) in Rome, where he earned a licentiate and a doctorate (respectively) in theology.

Saraiva Martins taught metaphysics for a year in Marino, Italy, then in 1959 came to the Roman Claretianum, where he taught fundamental and sacramental theology for a decade. He became rector of the Pontifical Urbaniana University for three terms (1977–1980, 1980–1983, 1986–1988).

On 26 May 1988, Saraiva Martins was appointed Secretary of the Congregation for Catholic Education and titular archbishop of Thuburnica. He received his episcopal consecration from Cardinal Agostino Casaroli, with Archbishops Jan Pieter Schotte and Giovanni Battista Re serving as co-consecrators, on the following 2 July in the Basilica of Ss. XII Apostoli. On 30 May 1998, he was named Prefect of the Congregation for the Causes of Saints.

Pope John Paul made him Cardinal Deacon of Nostra Signora del Sacro Cuore in the consistory of 21 February 2001. Like all major Vatican officials he lost his position on 2 April 2005 on the death of the pope. He was one of the cardinal electors who participated in the 2005 papal conclave that elected Pope Benedict XVI, who later confirmed him as prefect on 21 April 2005.

On 9 July 2008, Pope Benedict XVI accepted his resignation as prefect to be succeeded by Angelo Amato. On 24 February 2009, he was promoted to the order of cardinal bishops, with title of the suburbicarian see of Palestrina. Pope Benedict XVI allowed Martins to remain as Roman Postulator for the Cause for José Sánchez del Río, a 14-year-old Mexican youth and Cristeros who died a martyr. Martins had conducted the beatification ceremony in Mexico City for the young boy as a stand-in for Pope Benedict XVI. Sanchez del Rio was finally canonized on 16 October 2016 in Rome by Pope Francis.

External links 
 Biography at catholic-pages.com

Sources

External links

 Biography at catholic-pages.com
 

1932 births
20th-century Roman Catholic titular archbishops
21st-century Portuguese cardinals
Cardinal-bishops of Palestrina
Cardinals created by Pope John Paul II
Claretian cardinals
Living people
Members of the Congregation for Bishops
Members of the Congregation for Catholic Education
Members of the Congregation for the Causes of Saints
People from Guarda, Portugal
Pontifical Gregorian University alumni
Pontifical University of Saint Thomas Aquinas alumni